Annie Kuether (born August 18, 1950) was a Democratic member of the Kansas House of Representatives, representing the 55th district from 1997 to 2022.

Committee membership
 Energy and Utilities (Ranking Member)
 Judiciary

Major donors
The top 5 donors to Kuether's 2008 campaign:
1. Kansans for Lifesaving Cures 	$1,000 	
2. Golden Belt Telephone Assoc 	$1,000
3. Kansas Contractors Assoc 	$1,000 	
4. Kansas City Power and Light 	$1,000 	
5. Kansas National Education Assoc 	$1,000

References

External links
 Official website
 Kansas Legislature - Annie Kuether
 Project Vote Smart profile
 Kansas Votes profile
 State Surge - Legislative and voting track record
 Campaign contributions: 1998, 2002, 2004, 2006, 2008

Democratic Party members of the Kansas House of Representatives
Living people
Women state legislators in Kansas
21st-century American politicians
21st-century American women politicians
1950 births
20th-century American women politicians
20th-century American politicians